HMS Token was a British submarine of the third group of the T class. She was built as P328 at Portsmouth Dockyard, and launched on 19 March 1943. So far she has been the only ship of the Royal Navy to bear the name Token.

Operational service
Commissioned into service after the end of the Second World War, on 3 September 1945, she had a relatively peaceful career with the Navy. In 1953 she took part in the Fleet Review to celebrate the Coronation of Queen Elizabeth II.

She was modernised at Devonport Dockyard in 1955. Her career was spent on the Home Station and in the Mediterranean, re-fitting at Malta. In 1965 she was part of the 1st Submarine Squadron in Portsmouth, providing basic training to submarines crews. In that year she took part in Portsmouth 'Navy Days'. On 20 August 1967, Token was on exercise off the West coast of Scotland when she took the Danish merchant ship Opnor, which was adrift after her engines had broken down, under tow, preventing the merchant ship from drifting onto a reef.

She was finally scrapped at Cairn Ryan in March 1970.

Notes

References
 
  
 
 
 
 

 

British T-class submarines of the Royal Navy
Ships built in Portsmouth
1943 ships
World War II submarines of the United Kingdom
Cold War submarines of the United Kingdom